A. J. Miller House, also known as the Miller-Hemp House, is a historic home located near Middlebrook, Augusta County, Virginia. It was built in 1884, and is a two-story, three bay, brick dwelling in the Italianate style. It features a central Italianate entrance and tripartite second-floor window, and paired interior chimneys.  The interior features a wide variety of painted decoration by itinerant artist Green Berry Jones, who signed and dated his work June 17, 1892. They include large, brightly painted landscapes; vignettes; and woodgraining and marbleizing. Also on the property are five contributing outbuildings: two barns and a granary, a carriage house and chicken house.

It was listed on the National Register of Historic Places in 1982.

References

Houses on the National Register of Historic Places in Virginia
Italianate architecture in Virginia
Houses completed in 1882
Houses in Augusta County, Virginia
National Register of Historic Places in Augusta County, Virginia